KEUS-LD (channel 41) is a low-power television station in San Angelo, Texas, United States, affiliated with the Spanish-language Univision network. It is owned by Entravision Communications alongside UniMás affiliate KANG-LD (channel 31). Through a channel sharing agreement, the two stations transmit using KEUS-LD's spectrum from an antenna on North Bryant Boulevard in San Angelo.

History
The station signed on the air in 1999 as K41DO.

Subchannels
The station's digital signal is multiplexed:

References

External links

Univision network affiliates
UniMás network affiliates
EUS-LD
Spanish-language television stations in Texas
Low-power television stations in the United States
Television channels and stations established in 1999
Entravision Communications stations
1999 establishments in Texas